Spodiopogon is a genus of Asian plants in the grass family.

One species, Spodiopogon formosanus, is grown as a cultivated millet exclusively in Taiwan.

Species
 Species

 formerly included

References

 
Poaceae genera
Andropogoneae